Leigh Miller (born August 19, 1963) is an Australian Olympic hurdler. He represented his country in the men's 400 metres hurdles at the 1988 Summer Olympics. His time was a 50.53 in the hurdles. He also competed in the Men's 4 × 400 metres relay, where his team finished with a time of 3:05.93 in the qualifiers.

References

1963 births
Living people
Australian male hurdlers
Olympic athletes of Australia
Athletes (track and field) at the 1988 Summer Olympics
20th-century Australian people
21st-century Australian people